Harish Chandra Heda (14 October 1912 – 28 August 2002) was an Indian activist and politician. A political activist during his student days, he was one of the founders of the Hyderabad unit of Indian National Congress in 1930. As politician, he represented Nizamabad in the parliament for three terms, between 1952 and 1967.

References

External links 
 Harish Chandra Heda bioprofile

1912 births
2002 deaths
India MPs 1952–1957
India MPs 1957–1962
India MPs 1962–1967
People from Osmanabad district
Indian independence activists from Andhra Pradesh
Prisoners and detainees of British India
Members of the Constituent Assembly of India